Oak Hill is a suburban unincorporated community located in Fairfax County, Virginia, United States.

Geography
Oak Hill is located in Fairfax County, just east of Washington Dulles International Airport and south of the Dulles Toll and Access Roads. The town of Herndon lies immediately to the north, while the unincorporated community of Chantilly is adjacent to Oak Hill in the south. Franklin Farm, Floris and McNair are census-designated places located within the larger Oak Hill community.

As an unincorporated area, Oak Hill's boundaries are not officially defined by either a municipal government, the government of Fairfax County, or the U.S. Census Bureau. The United States Postal Service defines Oak Hill's boundaries by way of its ZIP code, 20171.

Public facilities
Schools serving the Oak Hill area (but not necessarily in Oak Hill), include Oak Hill Elementary, Fox Mill Elementary, Floris Elementary, McNair Elementary, Lutie Lewis Coates Elementary, Navy Elementary, Crossfield Elementary, Franklin Middle School, Rachel Carson Middle School, Chantilly High School, South Lakes High School, Westfield High School, and Oakton High School.

The Oak Hill community is served by the Oak Hill post office.  Mail may be addressed to Herndon or Oak Hill using zip code 20171.

Amenities include Frying Pan Farm Park, a working museum farm operated by Fairfax County Park Authority.

Notable residents

A. Scott Crossfield was the first pilot to fly at twice the speed of sound, and lived in what is now Oak Hill (then Herndon). The local elementary school, Crossfield Elementary (Home of the Rockets!), and adjacent park were named after Crossfield in honor of his active mind, commitment to education, and contributions to aeronautical science.

Charles Burlingame, pilot of the doomed American Airlines Flight 77 aircraft which was crashed by terrorists into the Pentagon during the September 11, 2001 attacks, resided in Oak Hill before his death.

See also
Oak Hill (Annandale, Virginia)
Oak Hill (James Monroe House)
Oak Hill (disambiguation)

Sources

Census Bureau Statistics for Oak Hill Zip Code area

External links

Oak Hill Plantation
Oak Hill property
Frying Pan Farm Park
Oak Hill Virginia News and Blog
Franklin Farm HOA
Franklin Oaks HOA
Chantilly Highlands HOA
Bradley Farms HOA
Great Oak HOA
Emerald Chase HOA
Fox Run HOA
Fox Mill Estates HOA

Unincorporated communities in Fairfax County, Virginia
Unincorporated communities in Virginia
Washington metropolitan area